Rainer Salzburger (born 21 October 1944) is an Austrian boxer. He competed in the men's light middleweight event at the 1968 Summer Olympics. At the 1968 Summer Olympics, he lost to David Jackson of Uganda.

References

1944 births
Living people
Austrian male boxers
Olympic boxers of Austria
Boxers at the 1968 Summer Olympics
People from Kufstein District
Sportspeople from Tyrol (state)
Light-middleweight boxers
20th-century Austrian people